Sir Marcus Lowther-Crofton, 1st Baronet (died 17 January 1784) was an Anglo-Irish politician.

He was born Marcus Lowther, the son of Gorges Lowther MP, of Kilrue, County Meath, and Jane Beresford, daughter of Sir Tristram Beresford, 3rd Baronet and Nichola Sophia Hamilton. On 9 September 1743 he married Catherine Crofton, daughter of Sir Edward Crofton, 3rd Baronet and Mary Nixon, and in 1745 he legally changed his surname to Lowther-Crofton. They had seven children.

Lowther-Crofton, like his father and his brother Gorges Lowther (1713-1792), represented Ratoath in the Irish House of Commons between 1753 and 1760. On 12 June 1758 he was created a baronet in the Baronetage of Ireland. He represented Roscommon Borough from 1761 to 1768, before sitting again for Ratoath between 1769 and 1776.

He was  created a Baronet, of the Mote in County Roscommon in 1758. He was succeeded in his title by his eldest son, Edward Crofton, whose wife, Anne Crofton, was created Baroness Crofton in 1797. His daughter Sophia married the High Court judge Peter Metge; another daughter Catherine married Sir James  Quaile Somerville, 3rd Baronet of Somerville, and was the grandmother of the first Baron Athlumney.

References

Year of birth unknown
1784 deaths
18th-century Anglo-Irish people
Irish MPs 1727–1760
Irish MPs 1761–1768
Irish MPs 1769–1776
Baronets in the Baronetage of Ireland
Marcus